Frederico André Ferrão Venâncio (born 4 February 1993) is a Portuguese professional footballer who plays for Spanish club SD Eibar as a central defender.

Club career

Vitória Setúbal
Born in Gâmbia – Pontes – Alto da Guerra, Setúbal, Venâncio joined local Vitória FC's youth academy at the age of 9, then returned for his last year as a junior from S.L. Benfica. He made his Primeira Liga debut for the former club on 13 January 2013, coming on as a late substitute in a 5–0 home win against Moreirense FC. He scored his first league goal on 7 April of the same year, but in a 2–1 away loss to Rio Ave FC.

On 16 August 2017, Venâncio signed with English Championship side Sheffield Wednesday on a season-long loan. He made his league debut on 23 December, playing the full 90 minutes in the 1–2 home defeat against Middlesbrough.

Venâncio scored his first and only goal for Wednesday on 6 May 2018, helping the hosts defeat Norwich City 5–1.

Vitória Guimarães
Venâncio signed a four-year contract with Vitória S.C. on 7 July 2018. A reserve player under Luís Castro in his first year, he became first choice after Ivo Vieira took over.

On 4 October 2020, Venâncio was loaned to Spanish Segunda División club CD Lugo for one year.

Eibar
On 6 July 2021, Venâncio joined SD Eibar of the same country and league on a three-year deal.

International career
Venâncio earned the first of his two caps for the Portugal under-21 team on 25 March 2013, featuring the last minutes of the 2–1 friendly defeat of the Republic of Ireland in Dundalk. He was part of the squad at the 2015 UEFA European Under-21 Championship, being an unused squad member for the runners-up.

Personal life
Venâncio's father, Pedro, was also a footballer and a central defender. He too was brought up at Vitória.

Career statistics

References

External links

1993 births
Living people
Sportspeople from Setúbal
Portuguese footballers
Association football defenders
Primeira Liga players
Vitória F.C. players
Vitória S.C. players
English Football League players
Sheffield Wednesday F.C. players
Segunda División players
CD Lugo players
SD Eibar footballers
Portugal youth international footballers
Portugal under-21 international footballers
Portuguese expatriate footballers
Expatriate footballers in England
Expatriate footballers in Spain
Portuguese expatriate sportspeople in England
Portuguese expatriate sportspeople in Spain